Leopold II, Duke of Austria (1328 – 10 August 1344), a member of the House of Habsburg, was the younger son of Duke Otto the Merry. 

Otto's first wife was Elizabeth of Bavaria, a daughter of Stephen I, Duke of Bavaria by his marriage to Jutta of Schweidnitz. They had two sons, Leopold and his brother Frederick III (1327–1344), and after their father's death in 1339 both were titular Dukes of Austria, but both died before coming of age. On 10 August 1344, at the age of sixteen, Leopold died suddenly. On 11 December 1344, four months later, his brother Frederick also died equally suddenly. In both cases, there were suspicions of poisoning. The beneficiary of their deaths was their uncle Albert II, Duke of Austria, the brother of Otto, who continued to rule Austria until his death in 1358.

Ancestry

Notes

1328 births
1344 deaths
14th-century dukes of Austria
Sons of monarchs